Tes Schouten (born 31 December 2000) is a Dutch swimmer. She competed in the women's 100 metre breaststroke at the 2019 World Aquatics Championships.

In 2017, she won the silver medal in the girls' 100 metre breaststroke at the 2017 European Junior Swimming Championships held in Netanya, Israel.

Personal bests

References

External links
 
 

2000 births
Living people
Dutch female breaststroke swimmers
Swimmers at the 2015 European Games
European Games medalists in swimming
European Games silver medalists for the Netherlands
Swimmers at the 2020 Summer Olympics
Olympic swimmers of the Netherlands
People from Bodegraven
21st-century Dutch women
European Aquatics Championships medalists in swimming
Medalists at the FINA World Swimming Championships (25 m)